The Southern Bug, also called Southern Buh (Pivdennyi Buh; , Yuzhny Bug;  or just ), and sometimes Boh River, is a navigable river located in Ukraine. It is the second-longest river in Ukraine.

Several regionally important cities and towns in Ukraine are located on the Southern Bug. Beginning in Western Ukraine and moving downstream, in a southeasterly direction, they are: Khmelnytskyi, Khmilnyk, Vinnytsia, Haivoron, Pervomaisk, Voznesensk and Mykolaiv.

Between 1941 and 1944 during World War II the Southern Bug formed the border between German-occupied Ukraine and the Romanian-occupied part of Ukraine, called Transnistria.

Nomenclature, etymology and history
(Pivdennyi Buh; ; ;  Ottoman )

Herodotus (c. 484–425 BCE) refers to the river using its ancient Greek name: Hypanis. During the Migration Period of the 5th to the 8th centuries CE the Southern Bug represented a major obstacle to all the migrating peoples in the area.

The long-standing local Slavic name of the river, Boh (Cyrillic: Бог), according to Zbigniew Gołąb as *bugъ/*buga derives from Indo-European verbal root *bheug- (having cognates in old Germanic word *bheugh- etc. with meaning of "bend, turn, moves away"), with hypothetical original meaning of "pertaining to a (river) bend", and derivatives in Russian búga ("low banks of a river, overgrown with bushes"), Polish bugaj ("bushes or woods in a river valley or on a steep river bank"), Latvian bauga ("marshy place by a river"). The 17th-century French military engineer and geographer Guillaume Le Vasseur de Beauplan recorded the name of the river as Bog.

From the 16th to the 18th centuries most of the south of Ukraine was under Turkish imperial domination and the colonists renamed the river using their language to the Aq-su, meaning the "White river". Indigenous Slavic toponyms were re-established after the conquest of the Pontic region from Turkish domination in the 17th and 18th centuries.

On March 6, 1918, the Central Council of the Ukrainian People's Republic adopted a law on the "administrative-territorial division of Ukraine", dividing it into regional districts. One of these, Pobozhia (meaning lands of the Boh), was in the upstream lands of the Southern Bug, near the source of the river.

Tributaries
The main tributaries of the Southern Bug are, from source to mouth (length in parentheses):
 Left: Buzhok (75), Ikva (57), Snyvoda (58), Desna (80), Sob (115), Udych (56), Synytsia (78), Synyukha (111), Velyka Korabelna (45), Mertvovid (114), Hnylyi Yelanets (103), Inhul (354)
 Right: Vovk (71), Zghar (95), Riv (104), Silnytsia (67), Dokhna (68), Savran (97), Kodyma (149), Bakshala (57), Chychyklia (156)

Ecology
In October 2020, the Southern Bug was stocked with three hundred and fifty kilograms of Hungarian carp and 50 kilograms of silver carp at Khmelnytskyi.

Bridges and ferries

The Varvarivskyi Bridge over Southern Bug in Mykolayiv is a swing bridge (facilitating ship building) with Europe's largest span (134 m).  It is also the southernmost bridge over the river.

Navigation
The river is technically navigable for dozens of kilometers up from its mouth; several river ports (such as Mykolayiv) exist.

In 2011, plans were announced to revive commercial freight navigation on the Southern Bug upstream of Mykolayiv, to facilitate the increasing grain export from Ukraine. As of April 2018, freight navigation was renewed between the estuary and a newly built grain terminal in the village of Prybuzhany, Voznesensk Raion, in the center of the Mykolaiv Oblast.

Gallery

References

External links

 Southern Buh rafting
  Boh in the Geographical Dictionary of the Kingdom of Poland (1880)
  Photos of the Southern Buh coasts
  Southern Buh rafting, photo

 
Rivers of Ukraine
Rivers of Khmelnytskyi Oblast
Rivers of Kirovohrad Oblast
Rivers of Mykolaiv Oblast
Rivers of Odesa Oblast
Rivers of Vinnytsia Oblast
Tributaries of the Black Sea